The National Association of Heavy Equipment Training Schools (NAHETS) founded 2005, is an association of heavy equipment operator training schools in the United States.  Mission Statement: Through curriculum development and operational oversight, NAHETS oversees member schools in training and preparing individual careers in heavy equipment and crane operations through member support, institutional standards, and industry relations.

References

  No license required Las Vegas Business Press 2006.  
  Construction Schools Train Future Industry Operators Lift and Access Magazine 2007.

External links
 National Heavy Equipment Operator School, Green Cove Springs, Florida
 Heavy Construction Academy, Brentwood, New Hampshire  

Organizations established in 2006
Organizations based in Nevada